Colvill may refer to:

David Colvill Anderson VRD QC (1916–1995), Scottish law lecturer, advocate, Unionist MP, Solicitor General for Scotland, and judge
Aoife Colvill (born 2000), Irish Australian football forward
Clerk Colvill, fictional character in Child ballad 42 who dies after being seduced by a mermaid
William Colvill (1612–1675), 17th-century Scottish minister, scholar, Principal of the University of Edinburgh from 1662 to 1675
William J. Colvill (1830–1905), American Union colonel in the American Civil War who led the 1st Minnesota Volunteer Infantry in the Battle of Gettysburg
Lord Colvill of Ochiltree, title in the Peerage of Scotland, created by the exiled King Charles II on 4 January 1651

See also
Colesville (disambiguation)
Coleville (disambiguation)
Colleville (disambiguation)
Colvile (disambiguation)
Colville (disambiguation)